In Greek mythology, Enceladus was one of the Giants, the offspring of Gaia (Earth), and Uranus (Sky). Enceladus was the traditional opponent of Athena during the Gigantomachy, the war between the Giants and the gods, and was said to be buried under Mount Etna in Sicily.

Mythology 
Enceladus was one of the Giants, who (according to Hesiod) were the offspring of Gaia, born from the blood that fell when Uranus was castrated by their son Cronus. The Giants fought Zeus and the other Olympian gods in the Gigantomachy, their epic battle for control of the cosmos. A Giant named Enceladus, fighting Athena, is attested in art as early as an Attic black-figure pot dating from the second quarter of the sixth century BC (Louvre E732). In literature, references to the Giant occur as early as the plays of the fifth-century BC Greek tragedian Euripides, where, for example, in Euripides' Ion, the chorus describes seeing on the late sixth-century Temple of Apollo at Delphi, Athena "brandishing her gorgon shield against Enceladus". Although traditionally opposed by Athena, Virgil and others have Enceladus being struck down by Zeus. In Euripides' comic satyr play Cyclops, Silenus, the drunken companion of the wine god Dionysus, boasts of having killed Enceladus with his spear.

The third-century BC poet Callimachus has Enceladus buried under the island of Sicily, and according to the mythographer Apollodorus, Athena hurled the island of Sicily at the fleeing Enceladus during the Gigantomachy. The Latin poets Virgil, Statius and Claudian all locate his burial under Mount Etna, although other traditions had the monster Typhon or the Hundred-Hander Briareus buried under Etna. For some Enceladus was instead buried in Italy.

The Latin poet Horace has Enceladus use trees as spears. The second-century geographer Pausanias reports that a Tegean statue of Athena was called "horse goddess" because, according to a local account, Athena "drove the chariot and horses against Enceladus".  Claudian calls Enceladus "all powerful king of the Earth-born giants", and has Gaia, imagining the Giants victorious, propose that "Enceladus, rule the sea".

The Dionysiaca 
The fifth-century Greek poet Nonnus, in his poem Dionysiaca, mentions Enceladus as one of the several Giants that Dionysus battles in the Gigantomachy. Nonnus has Gaia set the Giants against Dionysus, promising Enceladus Athena as his wife should the Giants subdue Dionysus. Dionysus fought Enceladus with fire, but Enceladus was ultimately defeated by Zeus: "[Dionysus] roasted the Giants' bodies with a great conflagration, an image on earth of the thunderbolt cast by Zeus. The torches blazed: fire was rolling all over the head of Encelados and making the air hot, but it did not vanquish him—Encelados bent not his knee in the steam of the earthly fire, since he was reserved for a thunderbolt."

Cause of volcanic eruptions and earthquakes 
Enceladus (like other vanquished monsters, thought to be buried under volcanos) was said to be the cause of earthquakes and volcanic eruptions. Mount Etna's eruptions were said to be the breath of Enceladus, and its tremors to be caused by him rolling over from side to side beneath the mountain. So, for example Virgil:Enceladus, his body lightning-scarred,
lies prisoned under all, so runs the tale:
o'er him gigantic Aetna breathes in fire
from crack and seam; and if he haply turn
to change his wearied side, Trinacria's isle
trembles and moans, and thick fumes mantle heaven. the c. 1st-century poem Aetna (perhaps written by Lucilius Junior):In Trinacrian waters Enceladus dies and is buried under Aetna by Jove's decree; with the ponderous mountain above him he tosses restlessly, and defiantly breathes from his throat a penal fire.and Claudian:In the midst of the island rise the charred cliffs of Aetna, eloquent monument of Jove’s victory over the Giants, the tomb of Enceladus, whose bound and bruisèd body breathes forth endless sulphur clouds from its burning wounds. Whene’er his rebellious shoulders shift their burden to the right or left, the island is shaken from its foundations and the walls of tottering cities sway this way and that.

Ancient art 

The battle between Athena and Enceladus was a popular theme in Greek vase paintings, with examples from as early as the middle of the sixth century BC. We know, from the description given in Euripides' Ion, that the battle was depicted on the late sixth-century BC Temple of Apollo at Delphi.

The east pediment of the Old Temple of Athena on the Acropolis of Athens, dating from the late sixth century, prominently displayed Athena standing over a fallen giant, possibly Enceladus. The battle was probably also depicted on the new peplos (robe) presented to Athena on the Acropolis of Athens as part of the Panathenaic festival.

In later art and literature 

At Versailles, Louis XIV's consistent iconographic theme of the triumphs of Apollo and the Olympians against all adversaries included the fountain of Enceladus in its own cabinet de verdure, the Bosquet de l'Encélade, which was cut into the surrounding woodland and outlined by trelliswork; the ensemble has recently been restored. According to an engraving of the fountain by Le Pautre (1677), the sculptor of the gilt-bronze Enceladus was Gaspar Mercy of Cambrai.

William Shakespeare mentions "Enceladus" in Titus Andronicus, Act 4, sc. 2, L 96. "I tell you younglings, not Enceladus."

John Keats mentions Enceladus among the Titans in his "Hyperion" (1818/1819).

Porthos is likened to Enceladus when he is buried in a rock fall in The Man in the Iron Mask by Alexandre Dumas.

In Herman Melville's Pierre, the image of Enceladus appears multiple times; the protagonist identifies with Enceladus in a dream.

Henry Wadsworth Longfellow, inspired by the suffering of the Second Italian War of Independence, wrote his poem "Enceladus" in 1859.

Enceladus is a main antagonist in Rick Riordan's The Lost Hero

Namesakes 
Enceladus, a moon of the planet Saturn, is named after the mythological Enceladus. Its south pole is interspersed with massive geysers of ice and water vapor that shoot hundreds of miles from its interior. The moon is considered by scientists to be one of the most likely locations in the Solar System to offer some habitability potential for microscopic life.

One of two surviving Short Belfast military transport aircraft is dubbed "Enceladus".

In Antarctica, there is a grouping of nunataks (ridge) on Alexander Island called the Enceladus Nunataks—but these nunataks were named after Saturn's moon, not after the giants of Greek mythology.

The Finnish eSports organisation ENCE takes its name from Enceladus.

Notes

References 

 Aeschylus (?), Prometheus Bound in Aeschylus, with an English translation by Herbert Weir Smyth, Ph. D. in two volumes. Vol 2. Cambridge, Massachusetts. Harvard University Press. 1926. Online version at the Perseus Digital Library.
 Andrews, Tamra, Dictionary of Nature Myths: Legends of the Earth, Sea, and Sky, Oxford University Press, 2000. .
 Antoninus Liberalis, Celoria, Francis, The Metamorphoses of Antoninus Liberalis: A Translation with Commentary, Psychology Press, 1992. .
 Apollodorus, Apollodorus, The Library, with an English Translation by Sir James George Frazer, F.B.A., F.R.S. in 2 Volumes. Cambridge, Massachusetts, Harvard University Press; London, William Heinemann Ltd. 1921. Online version at the Perseus Digital Library.
 Arafat, K. W., Classical Zeus: A Study in Art and Literature, Clarendon Press, Oxford 1990. .
 Batrachomyomachia in Hesiod, the Homeric hymns, and Homerica with an English translation by Hugh G. Evelyn-White, W. Heinemann, The Macmillan Co. in London, New York. 1914. Internet Archive
 Boardman, John, The Cambridge Ancient History, Cambridge University Press, 1994. .
 Callimachus, Callimachus and Lycophron with an English translation by A. W. Mair ; Aratus, with an English translation by G. R. Mair, London: W. Heinemann, New York: G. P. Putnam 1921. Internet Archive.
 Celoria, Francis, The Metamorphoses of Antoninus Liberalis: A Translation with a Commentary, Routledge 1992. . Online version at ToposText.
 Claudian, Claudian with an English translation by Maurice Platnauer, Volume II, Loeb Classical Library No. 136. Cambridge, Massachusetts: Harvard University Press; London: William Heinemann, Ltd.. 1922. . Internet Archive.
 Conington, John, The works of Virgil, with a Commentary by John Conington, M.A. Late Corpus Professor of Latin in the University of Oxford. London. Whittaker and Co., Ave Maria Lane. 1876.
 Cook, Arthur Bernard (1925), Zeus: A Study in Ancient Religion, Volume II: Zeus God of the Dark Sky (Thunder and Lightning), Part II: Appendixes and Index, Cambridge University Press. Online version at openlibrary.org
 Cook, Arthur Bernard (1940), Zeus: A Study in Ancient Religion, Volume III: Zeus God of the Dark Sky (Earthquakes, Clouds, Wind, Dew, Rain, Meteorites), Part I: Text and Notes, Cambridge University Press. Online version at openlibrary.org
 Durling, Robert M. The Divine Comedy of Dante Alighieri : Volume 1: Inferno, Oxford University Press, 1996. .
 Ellis, Robinson, Aetna: A Critical Recension of the Text, Based on a New Examination of Mss. With Prolegomena, Translation, Textual and Exegetical Commentary, Excursus, and Complete Index of the Words, Oxford : Clarendon Press, 1901.
 Ely, Talfourd, "Athena and Enkelados, as Represented on a Greek Vase", in The Archaeological Journal, Volume 51, Royal Archaeological Institute., 1894.
 Euripides, Cyclops in Euripides, with an English translation by David Kovacs, Cambridge. Harvard University Press.
 Euripides, Heracles, translated by E. P. Coleridge in The Complete Greek Drama, edited by Whitney J. Oates and Eugene O'Neill, Jr. Volume 1. New York. Random House. 1938.
 Euripides, Ion, translated by Robert Potter in The Complete Greek Drama, edited by Whitney J. Oates and Eugene O'Neill, Jr. Volume 1. New York. Random House. 1938.
 Frazer, J. G., Pausanias's Description of Greece. Translated with a Commentary by J. G. Frazer., Macmillan, 1898.
 Gantz, Timothy, Early Greek Myth: A Guide to Literary and Artistic Sources, Johns Hopkins University Press, 1996, Two volumes:  (Vol. 1),  (Vol. 2).
 Hesiod, Theogony, in The Homeric Hymns and Homerica with an English Translation by Hugh G. Evelyn-White, Cambridge, Massachusetts., Harvard University Press; London, William Heinemann Ltd. 1914. Online version at the Perseus Digital Library.
 Homer; The Odyssey with an English Translation by A.T. Murray, PH.D. in two volumes. Cambridge, Massachusetts., Harvard University Press; London, William Heinemann, Ltd. 1919. Online version at the Perseus Digital Library.
 Horace, The Odes and Carmen Saeculare of Horace. John Conington. trans. London. George Bell and Sons. 1882. Online version at the Perseus Digital Library.
 Hyginus, Gaius Julius, The Myths of Hyginus. Edited and translated by Mary A. Grant, Lawrence: University of Kansas Press, 1960.
 Kirk, G. S., J. E. Raven, M. Schofield, The Presocratic Philosophers: A Critical History with a Selection of Texts, Cambridge University Press, Dec 29, 1983. .
 Lazaridou-Varotsos, Mary S., Earthquake Prediction by Seismic Electric Signals: The success of the VAN method over thirty years, Springer, 2012. .
 Lemprière, John, A Classical Dictionary, E. Duyckinck, G. Long, 1825.
 Lycophron, Alexandra (or Cassandra) in Callimachus and Lycophron with an English translation by A. W. Mair ; Aratus, with an English translation by G. R. Mair, London: W. Heinemann, New York: G. P. Putnam 1921. Internet Archive
 Manilius. Astronomica. Edited and translated by G. P. Goold. Loeb Classical Library No. 469. Cambridge, Massachusetts: Harvard University Press, 1977. Online version at Harvard University Press
 Mineur, W. H. Callimachus: Hymn to Delos, Brill Archive, 1984. .
 Nonnus, Dionysiaca; translated by Rouse, W H D, II Books XVI–XXXV. Loeb Classical Library No. 345, Cambridge, Massachusetts, Harvard University Press; London, William Heinemann Ltd. 1940. Internet Archive
 Nonnus, Dionysiaca; translated by Rouse, W H D, III Books XXXVI–XLVIII. Loeb Classical Library No. 346, Cambridge, Massachusetts, Harvard University Press; London, William Heinemann Ltd. 1940. Internet Archive
 Parker, Robert, On Greek Religion, Cornell University Press, 2011. .
 Pausanias, Pausanias Description of Greece with an English Translation by W.H.S. Jones, Litt. D., and H.A. Ormerod, M.A., in 4 Volumes. Cambridge, Massachusetts, Harvard University Press; London, William Heinemann Ltd. 1918. Online version at the Perseus Digital Library.
 Philostratus, The Life of Apollonius of Tyana: Volume I. Books 1-5, translated by F.C. Conybeare, Loeb Classical Library No. 16. Harvard University Press, Cambridge, Massachusetts. 1912. . Internet Archive
 Philostratus, On Heroes, editors Jennifer K. Berenson MacLean, Ellen Bradshaw Aitken, BRILL, 2003, .
 Philostratus the Elder, Imagines, translated by A. Fairbanks, Loeb Classical Library No, 256. Harvard University Press, Cambridge, Massachusetts. 1931. . Internet Archive
 Pindar, Odes, Diane Arnson Svarlien. 1990. Online version at the Perseus Digital Library.
 Plumptre, Edward Hayes, Æschylos: Tragedies and Fragments, Heath, 1901.
 Propertius, The Complete Elegies of Sextus Propertius, translated by Vincent Katz, Princeton University Press, 2004. .
 Quintus Smyrnaeus, Quintus Smyrnaeus: The Fall of Troy, Translator: A.S. Way; Harvard University Press, Cambridge MA, 1913. Internet Archive
 Ridgway, David, The First Western Greeks, CUP Archive, 1992. .
 Schefold, Karl, Luca Giuliani, Gods and Heroes in Late Archaic Greek Art, Cambridge University Press, 1992 .
 Seneca, Tragedies, Volume I: Hercules. Trojan Women. Phoenician Women. Medea. Phaedra. Edited and translated by John G. Fitch. Loeb Classical Library No. 62. Cambridge, Massachusetts: Harvard University Press, 2002. . Online version at Harvard University Press.
 Seneca, Tragedies, Volume II: Oedipus. Agamemnon. Thyestes. Hercules on Oeta. Octavia. Edited and translated by John G. Fitch. Loeb Classical Library No. 78. Cambridge, Massachusetts: Harvard University Press, 2004. . Online version at Harvard University Press.
 Silius Italicus, Punica with an English translation by J. D. Duff, Volume II, Cambridge, Massachusetts., Harvard University Press; London, William Heinemann, Ltd. 1934. Internet Archive
 Statius, Statius with an English Translation by J. H. Mozley, Volume II, Thebaid, Books V–XII, Achilleid, Loeb Classical Library No. 207, London: William Heinemann, Ltd., New York: G. P. Putnamm's Sons, 1928. . Internet Archive
 Stewart, Andrew F., Greek Sculpture: An Exploration, Yale University Press, 1990.
 Strabo, Geography, translated by Horace Leonard Jones; Cambridge, Massachusetts: Harvard University Press; London: William Heinemann, Ltd. (1924). LacusCurtis, Books 6–14, at the Perseus Digital Library
 Tillyard, E. M. W., The Hope Vases : A Catalogue and a Discussion of the Hope Collection of Greek Vases, with an Introduction on the History of the Collection and on Late Attic and South Italian Vases, Cambridge University Press 1923.
 Virgil, Aeneid, Theodore C. Williams. trans. Boston. Houghton Mifflin Co. 1910. Online version at the Perseus Digital Library
 Weller, Charles Heald, Athens and Its Monuments, The Macmillan Company, 1913.
 Woodard, Roger D., The Cambridge Companion to Greek Mythology, Cambridge University Press, 2007. .

Gigantes
Deeds of Athena
Children of Gaia